In six-dimensional geometry, a uniform 6-polytope is a six-dimensional uniform polytope. A uniform polypeton is vertex-transitive, and all facets are uniform 5-polytopes.

The complete set of convex uniform 6-polytopes has not been determined, but most can be made as Wythoff constructions from a small set of symmetry groups. These construction operations are represented by the permutations of rings of the Coxeter-Dynkin diagrams. Each combination of at least one ring on every connected group of nodes in the diagram produces a uniform 6-polytope.

The simplest uniform polypeta are regular polytopes: the 6-simplex {3,3,3,3,3}, the 6-cube (hexeract) {4,3,3,3,3}, and the 6-orthoplex (hexacross) {3,3,3,3,4}.

History of discovery 
 Regular polytopes: (convex faces)
 1852: Ludwig Schläfli proved in his manuscript Theorie der vielfachen Kontinuität that there are exactly 3 regular polytopes in 5 or more dimensions.
 Convex semiregular polytopes: (Various definitions before Coxeter's uniform category)
 1900: Thorold Gosset enumerated the list of nonprismatic semiregular convex polytopes with regular facets (convex regular polytera) in his publication On the Regular and Semi-Regular Figures in Space of n Dimensions.
 Convex uniform polytopes:
 1940: The search was expanded systematically by H.S.M. Coxeter in his publication Regular and Semi-Regular Polytopes.
 Nonregular uniform star polytopes: (similar to the nonconvex uniform polyhedra)
 Ongoing: Jonathan Bowers and other researchers search for other non-convex uniform 6-polytopes, with a current count of 41348 known uniform 6-polytopes outside infinite families (convex and non-convex), excluding the prisms of the uniform 5-polytopes. The list is not proven complete.

Uniform 6-polytopes by fundamental Coxeter groups 

Uniform 6-polytopes with reflective symmetry can be generated by these four Coxeter groups, represented by permutations of rings of the Coxeter-Dynkin diagrams.

There are four fundamental reflective symmetry groups which generate 153 unique uniform 6-polytopes.

Uniform prismatic families 

Uniform prism

There are 6 categorical uniform prisms based on the uniform 5-polytopes.

Uniform duoprism

There are 11 categorical uniform duoprismatic families of polytopes based on Cartesian products of lower-dimensional uniform polytopes. Five are formed as the product of a uniform 4-polytope with a regular polygon, and six are formed by the product of two uniform polyhedra:

Uniform triaprism

There is one infinite family of uniform triaprismatic families of polytopes constructed as a Cartesian products of three regular polygons. Each combination of at least one ring on every connected group produces a uniform prismatic 6-polytope.

Enumerating the convex uniform 6-polytopes 
 Simplex family: A6 [34] - 
 35 uniform 6-polytopes as permutations of rings in the group diagram, including one regular:
 {34} - 6-simplex - 
 Hypercube/orthoplex family: B6 [4,34] - 
 63 uniform 6-polytopes as permutations of rings in the group diagram, including two regular forms:
 {4,33} — 6-cube (hexeract) - 
 {33,4} — 6-orthoplex, (hexacross) - 
 Demihypercube D6 family: [33,1,1] - 
 47 uniform 6-polytopes (16 unique) as permutations of rings in the group diagram, including:
 {3,32,1}, 121 6-demicube (demihexeract) - ; also as h{4,33}, 
 E6 family: [33,1,1] - 
 39 uniform 6-polytopes (16 unique) as permutations of rings in the group diagram, including:
 {3,3,32,1}, 221 - 
 {3,32,2}, 122 - 

These fundamental families generate 153 nonprismatic convex uniform polypeta.

In addition, there are 57 uniform 6-polytope constructions based on prisms of the uniform 5-polytopes: [3,3,3,3,2], [4,3,3,3,2], [32,1,1,2], excluding the penteract prism as a duplicate of the hexeract.

In addition, there are infinitely many uniform 6-polytope based on:
 Duoprism prism families: [3,3,2,p,2], [4,3,2,p,2], [5,3,2,p,2].
 Duoprism families: [3,3,3,2,p], [4,3,3,2,p], [5,3,3,2,p].
 Triaprism family: [p,2,q,2,r].

The A6 family 

There are 32+4−1=35 forms, derived by marking one or more nodes of the Coxeter-Dynkin diagram.
All 35 are enumerated below. They are named by Norman Johnson from the Wythoff construction operations upon regular 6-simplex (heptapeton). Bowers-style acronym names are given in parentheses for cross-referencing.

The A6 family has symmetry of order 5040 (7 factorial).

The coordinates of uniform 6-polytopes with 6-simplex symmetry can be generated as permutations of simple integers in 7-space, all in hyperplanes with normal vector (1,1,1,1,1,1,1).

The B6 family 

There are 63 forms based on all permutations of the Coxeter-Dynkin diagrams with one or more rings.

The B6 family has symmetry of order 46080 (6 factorial x 26).

They are named by Norman Johnson from the Wythoff construction operations upon the regular 6-cube and 6-orthoplex. Bowers names and acronym names are given for cross-referencing.

The D6 family 

The D6 family has symmetry of order 23040 (6 factorial x 25).

This family has 3×16−1=47 Wythoffian uniform polytopes, generated by marking one or more nodes of the D6 Coxeter-Dynkin diagram. Of these, 31 (2×16−1) are repeated from the B6 family and 16 are unique to this family. The 16 unique forms are enumerated below. Bowers-style acronym names are given for cross-referencing.

The E6 family 

There are 39 forms based on all permutations of the Coxeter-Dynkin diagrams with one or more rings. Bowers-style acronym names are given for cross-referencing. The E6 family has symmetry of order 51,840.

Triaprisms 
Uniform triaprisms, {p}×{q}×{r}, form an infinite class for all integers p,q,r>2. {4}×{4}×{4} makes a lower symmetry form of the 6-cube.

Non-Wythoffian 6-polytopes 

In 6 dimensions and above, there are an infinite amount of non-Wythoffian convex uniform polytopes: the Cartesian product of the grand antiprism in 4 dimensions and any regular polygon in 2 dimensions. It is not yet proven whether or not there are more.

Regular and uniform honeycombs 

There are four fundamental affine Coxeter groups and 27 prismatic groups that generate regular and uniform tessellations in 5-space:

Regular and uniform honeycombs include:
  There are 12 unique uniform honeycombs, including:
 5-simplex honeycomb 
 Truncated 5-simplex honeycomb 
 Omnitruncated 5-simplex honeycomb 
   There are 35 uniform honeycombs, including:
 Regular hypercube honeycomb of Euclidean 5-space, the 5-cube honeycomb, with symbols {4,33,4},  = 
   There are 47 uniform honeycombs, 16 new, including:
 The uniform alternated hypercube honeycomb, 5-demicubic honeycomb, with symbols h{4,33,4},  =  = 
 , [31,1,3,31,1]: There are 20 unique ringed permutations, and 3 new ones. Coxeter calls the first one a quarter 5-cubic honeycomb, with symbols q{4,33,4},  = . The other two new ones are  = ,  = .

Regular and uniform hyperbolic honeycombs 

There are no compact hyperbolic Coxeter groups of rank 6, groups that can generate honeycombs with all finite facets, and a finite vertex figure. However, there are 12 paracompact hyperbolic Coxeter groups of rank 6, each generating uniform honeycombs in 5-space as permutations of rings of the Coxeter diagrams.

Notes on the Wythoff construction for the uniform 6-polytopes 

Construction of the reflective 6-dimensional uniform polytopes are done through a Wythoff construction process, and represented through a Coxeter-Dynkin diagram, where each node represents a mirror. Nodes are ringed to imply which mirrors are active. The full set of uniform polytopes generated are based on the unique permutations of ringed nodes. Uniform 6-polytopes are named in relation to the regular polytopes in each family. Some families have two regular constructors and thus may have two ways of naming them.

Here's the primary operators available for constructing and naming the uniform 6-polytopes.

The prismatic forms and bifurcating graphs can use the same truncation indexing notation, but require an explicit numbering system on the nodes for clarity.

See also 
 List of regular polytopes#Higher dimensions

Notes

References 
 T. Gosset: On the Regular and Semi-Regular Figures in Space of n Dimensions, Messenger of Mathematics, Macmillan, 1900
 A. Boole Stott: Geometrical deduction of semiregular from regular polytopes and space fillings, Verhandelingen of the Koninklijke academy van Wetenschappen width unit Amsterdam, Eerste Sectie 11,1, Amsterdam, 1910
 H.S.M. Coxeter:
 H.S.M. Coxeter, M.S. Longuet-Higgins und J.C.P. Miller: Uniform Polyhedra, Philosophical Transactions of the Royal Society of London, Londne, 1954
 H.S.M. Coxeter, Regular Polytopes, 3rd Edition, Dover New York, 1973
 Kaleidoscopes: Selected Writings of H.S.M. Coxeter, edited by F. Arthur Sherk, Peter McMullen, Anthony C. Thompson, Asia Ivic Weiss, Wiley-Interscience Publication, 1995, 
 (Paper 22) H.S.M. Coxeter, Regular and Semi Regular Polytopes I, [Math. Zeit. 46 (1940) 380-407, MR 2,10]
 (Paper 23) H.S.M. Coxeter, Regular and Semi-Regular Polytopes II, [Math. Zeit. 188 (1985) 559-591]
 (Paper 24) H.S.M. Coxeter, Regular and Semi-Regular Polytopes III, [Math. Zeit. 200 (1988) 3-45]
 N.W. Johnson: The Theory of Uniform Polytopes and Honeycombs, Ph.D. Dissertation, University of Toronto, 1966

External links 
 Polytope names
 Polytopes of Various Dimensions, Jonathan Bowers
 Multi-dimensional Glossary
 

6-polytopes